Stefan Herheim (born Oslo, 13 March 1970), is a Norwegian opera director, based in Germany.


Life 
He studied cello while working as a production assistant at Norwegian National Opera in Oslo.  From 1994 to 1999, he studied opera direction with Götz Friedrich at Hochschule für Musik und Theater Hamburg.

Awards 
He has been named opera director of the year (Regisseur des Jahres) three times by the German magazine Opernwelt—in 2007 for a Don Giovanni at the Aalto Theatre in Essen, in 2009 for an acclaimed Parsifal at the Bayreuth Festival, and in 2010 for a Rosenkavalier at the Staatsoper Stuttgart.

References

Sources 
 wagneropera.net profile page. List of productions, links to interviews, videos and photos
 Royal Opera House, London, brief biography of Herheim
 The Guardian, profile of Herheim's Wagner work, 29 April 2010.

1970 births
Living people
Theatre people from Oslo
Norwegian opera directors
Norwegian expatriates in Germany